Johannes Nicolaas Maria ("Jeroen") Straathof (born 18 November 1972) is a retired Dutch racing cyclist and speed skater. Straathof was the first, and still the only, athlete in the world to represent his country at the Summer Olympics, the Winter Olympics and the Paralympics.

Life
Straathof started his sports career as a speed skater, becoming World Junior Champion in Warsaw 1992. His best distance was the 1500 metres, and as the longest distances were his worst he only participated in one international all-round championship in his career. He made his Olympic debut at the 1994 Winter Olympics held in Lillehammer. He was qualified for the 1500 metres and placed 9th. In 1996 the World Single Distance Championships were introduced, and Straathof became the first World Champion over 1500 metres. He was never able to equal this performance or come close to winning another medal, and he made a switch to track cycling.

As pilot at the tandem he teamed up with visually handicapped cyclist Jan Mulder. In 1998 they took part in the World Championships and won the silver medal. At the 1999 European Championships they won the gold, and a year later they were acclaimed 2000 Summer Paralympics champions.

Straathof decided to make another switch, and became part of the Dutch Team Pursuit team that qualified for the 2002 World Championships, where they placed seventh. A year later they placed 9th, and in 2004 they improved their ranking to the fourth position. The team, composed of Straathof, Jens Mouris, Peter Schep and Levi Heimans, also qualified for the 2004 Summer Olympics where they came in fifth. After those Olympics Straathof ended his professional sports career.

Finally, Straathof is one of the few athletes who have competed in both the Summer and Winter Olympic games.

Private life
Straathof is the brother of former speed skater Judith Straathof. He is married to wheelchair basketball player Evelyn van Leeuwen and they have four children.

Speed skating

Personal records

Tournament overview

 DNQ = Did not qualify for the last event
Source:

Cycling

Results
Track cycling (pilot at the tandem), 4 km pursuit 
World championships 1998: Silver medal
European championships 1999: European champion
Paralympic game Sydney 2000: Paralympic champion 
 
Track Cycling, 4 km team pursuit 
World championships 2002: 7th
World championships 2003: 9th
World championships 2004: 4th
Olympic games Athene 2004: 5th

References

1972 births
Living people
Speed skaters at the 1994 Winter Olympics
Cyclists at the 2004 Summer Olympics
Olympic cyclists of the Netherlands
Olympic speed skaters of the Netherlands
Dutch male speed skaters
Dutch male cyclists
Dutch track cyclists
Cyclists at the 2000 Summer Paralympics
Paralympic cyclists of the Netherlands
Paralympic gold medalists for the Netherlands
People from Zoeterwoude
Medalists at the 2000 Summer Paralympics
Sportspeople from South Holland
World Single Distances Speed Skating Championships medalists
Paralympic medalists in cycling
Cyclists from South Holland